Bhagwanpur (in Hindi : भगवानपुर) is a block in Vaishali district, Bihar state. According to the census website, all blocks in Bihar state are named C.D. Blocks (community development blocks)

Major roads
NH-77

Block office

Villages

Number of Panchayats : 21
Number of Villages : 99

Population and communities
Male Population : 84457 (2009 est.)
Female Population : 77756  
Total Population : 162213  
SC Total Population : 32346
ST Total Population : 0
Minority Total Population : 16736  
Population Density : 1371  
Sex Ratio : 921

Public distribution system
Nos of HHs : 25121  
BPL Card Holders : 23187 
Antodaya Card Holders : 4475
Annapurna Card Holders : 313
APL : 22676  
Nos of Fair Price Shops: 73

Education
Literacy rate : 53.3%(2001 ist.)
Male literacy rate : 65.6%
Female literacy rate : 39.8%

Schools
Primary School : 88(2009 ist.)
Upper Primary School : 71

Banking
Number of banks : 9

References 

Community development blocks in Vaishali district